Walker Amiel Loseno (born 12 January 1982), known in Greece as Amalia Loseno, is an American-born Greek retired footballer who played as a midfielder. She has been a member of the Greece women's national team.

College career
Loseno has attended the Gonzaga University in Spokane, Washington.

International career
Loseno began playing for the Greece in January 2003, after coming across a notice on a women's football website that the Greek national team was looking for players. She represented the country at the 2004 Summer Olympics.

Personal life
Loseno was born to Susan Johnson and David Loseno, and is named after the photographer Walker Evans. Though born in the United States, Amalia was able to obtain Greek citizenship in 2004 through her great-grandparents on her mother's side, who emigrated to the United States from Plomari. She holds Greek citizenship under her baptismal name, Amalia.

See also
 Greece at the 2004 Summer Olympics

References

External links
 
FIFA.com
http://www.seattlepi.com/news/article/Renton-girl-embarks-on-big-fat-Greek-Olympic-1148611.php
http://www.ussoccer.com/stories/2014/03/17/11/36/u-s-olympic-womens-soccer-team-kicks-off-against-greece-tomorrow
http://www.gettyimages.com/photos/amalia-loseno-cat-reddick?excludenudity=true&sort=mostpopular&mediatype=photography&phrase=amalia%20loseno%20cat%20reddick
http://www.gozags.com/sports/w-soccer/spec-rel/072403aaa.html
http://www.gozags.com/sports/w-soccer/spec-rel/031803aaa.html

1982 births
Living people
Women's association football midfielders
Greek women's footballers
Greece women's international footballers
Olympic footballers of Greece
Footballers at the 2004 Summer Olympics
American women's soccer players
Soccer players from New York (state)
Soccer players from Washington (state)
Sportspeople from Renton, Washington
American people of Greek descent
Sportspeople of Greek descent
Citizens of Greece through descent
Gonzaga Bulldogs women's soccer players